Leigh-Anne Pinnock (born 4 October 1991) is an English singer, songwriter, fashion designer and actress. She rose to prominence in the 2010s as a member of the girl group Little Mix, one of the world's best-selling girl groups of all time. With Little Mix, she released six studio albums and achieved five number-one singles on the UK Singles Chart.

While in Little Mix, Pinnock released her documentary Leigh-Anne: Race, Pop & Power (2021), which was met with critical acclaim. At the 26th National Television Awards, it received a nomination for "Best Authored Documentary". In the same year, she made her acting debut in the film Boxing Day, which became the first British festive rom-com to be led by an all-black cast. Besides music, she is also known for her activism in fighting against racism and in 2020, she won the Equality Award in recognition for her work towards racial equality in the UK.

Early life
Leigh-Anne Pinnock was born on 4 October 1991, to black mixed-race parents Deborah Thornhill, a history teacher, and John Pinnock, and was raised in a Caribbean household. Pinnock lived in High Wycombe, Buckinghamshire. with her two older sisters Sian-Louise and Sairah. Pinnock has Barbadian and Jamaican ancestry and counts Jamaica as her second home. She has been spending her holidays there since she was a child, with many of her relatives still living there.

Before joining Little Mix, she worked as a waitress at Pizza Hut. Her early experience of organised singing came when she joined a youth club and choir then run by Jay Blades, who later became a trustee of her charity The Black Fund that she founded in 2021. In 2020, she spoke about the first time she experienced racism at the age of nine, for a documentary that was later aired on Channel 4.

Career

2011–2021: Little Mix and other ventures
Pinnock's first audition on The X Factor was "Only Girl (In the World)" by Rihanna. After she failed the first bootcamp challenge she was placed in a three-piece group named "Orion" alongside Jade Thirlwall. Orion performed rendition of "Yeah" by Chris Brown. Perrie Edwards and Jesy Nelson were in another group called "Faux Pas". Faux Pas performed a rendition of "Survivor" by Destiny's Child. Both groups, however, were eliminated. Later, the four were called back by the judges to form into the four-piece group Rhythmix, and they progressed to judges' houses. They eventually reached the live shows and were mentored by Tulisa Contostavlos. On 28 October 2011, it was announced that the band's new name would be Little Mix. In December 2011, Little Mix were announced as the winners, making them the first group to ever win the British version of the show.

As of 2022, Pinnock has released seven albums with the group: DNA (2012), Salute (2013), Get Weird (2015), Glory Days (2016),  LM5 (2018) Confetti (2020), and Between Us (2021).

Outside of the group Pinnock has ventured into her own solo projects. In February 2015, she launched a Tumblr fashion blog called "Leigh Loves". In 2016, Pinnock was attacked at a London restaurant by a male diner. In December 2017 while performing alongside Little Mix as an opening act for Ariana Grande, Dangerous Woman Tour, she suffered a burn backstage at one of their gigs. In April 2019, she signed to Sony/ATV via joint venture TwentySeven as a published songwriter. Later that month, Pinnock released her own swimwear range with Gabrielle Urquhart, titled In'A'Seashell.

In March 2019, Pinnock was named as the new face of the sports brand Umbro. In April 2020, she revealed she would be launching a documentary with BBC, detailing experiences of racism and colourism in the United Kingdom. In October 2020, the singer launched her own production house named Pinnock Productions, to help embrace diversity and cultures that are underrepresented in the media. In 2020, she released a style edit collection with ASOS, a British online fashion retailer. Later that month, it was announced that she would be making her acting debut in the upcoming Christmas film Boxing Day. Pinnock Productions contributed to the production of the film, which she also stars in.

In December 2020, Pinnock won the Equality Award at the Ethnicity Awards, along with group member Jade Thirlwall; in recognition for their work towards racial equality in the UK. In March 2021, it was announced she had signed to TaP Music to focus on her solo career; she stated her intent to pursue solo projects alongside her Little Mix commitments. In May 2021, her released documentary Leigh-Anne: Race, Pop & Power was released on BBC iPlayer and BBC One talking about racial issues and colourism in the music industry and her personal experiences. The documentary has been nominated for a National Television Award for Best Authored Documentary. In June 2021, Pinnock was announced as the new ambassador for Maybelline New York, an American cosmetic brand, and launched the "Brave Together" initiative in October.

In September 2021, journalist Charlie Brinkhurst-Cuff and Timi Sotire release the book "Black Joy" which includes a personal essay by Leigh-Anne, titled "The Power Within: Finding Purpose in Raising My Voice". In November 2021, it was announced that Pinnock would be one of the hosts for the 2021 MOBO Awards. In December 2021, she made her acting debut in the film Boxing Day for which she also recorded original music for the first time.

2022–present: Solo career and first studio album
In February 2022, Pinnock signed a record deal with Warner Records, and spent time between the UK and Jamaica recording for her debut album. A demo track of hers was later leaked online before being taken down. In July 2022, she joined the social media app Twitter, and revealed she is releasing her solo music when she's ready. In September 2022, Pinnock attended and spoke at the One Young World Summit in Manchester.

Personal life 
In 2012 during the release party for Little Mix's single "Wings", Pinnock met footballer Jordan Kiffin, and the pair were in an on-off relationship, from 2013 to 2016. In 2016 she started dating professional footballer Andre Gray. The couple eventually moved in together in December 2018 and in 2020 got engaged on their four-year anniversary. In May 2021, she announced that she was pregnant, and on 16 August 2021, she gave birth to twins. The gender and the names of twins remains unknown as Pinnock wishes to keep it private. In an interview for Women's Health, she spoke about her struggles with breastfeeding her twins and the sleep deprivation she was experiencing following their births. The couple currently resides in Surrey, England, but also due to Gray signing a four-year contract with the Greek football team of Aris, the couple will be splitting their time between the UK and the Greek city of Thessaloniki.

Pinnock has been open about her struggles with racism. In an interview with Glamour magazine in March 2019, she spoke about her experiences with racism and comments she received on social media, while feeling "invisible" for the first three years as the only black girl in Little Mix. In the same year she and band member Jade Thirlwall, with other British celebrities, climbed Mount Kilimanjaro to raise funds for Comic Relief's Red Nose Day.

In the rise of Black Lives Matter, during the summer of 2020, Pinnock spoke about racism in Britain and shared her own experiences in the music industry. In 2020, she attended the Black Lives Matter protests in London, and spoke out about the murder of African American George Floyd and the killing of Breonna Taylor by American police. Pinnock has since acknowledged her own privilege as a light-skinned, mixed-race woman. In her documentary: Leigh-Anne: Race, Pop & Power, she cites group member Jade Thirlwall, as someone she could turn to for support, who also shared similar experiences with racism for her mixed ethnicity. In the documentary she and her fiancé Andre Gray also expressed their intent in helping the black community by using their platforms.

On 14 May 2021, Pinnock, in partnership with her fiancé and sister Sairah, launched a charity called The Black Fund. The charity is made to support existing charities and groups who deliver support to the black community, including financial support. In the same month she called British Media for mistaking her for band member Jade Thirlwall, after her pregnancy announcement. Pinnock also pointed out that this wasn't the first time that the Little Mix stars have been mistaken for each other.

Discography

Songwriting credits

Filmography

Awards and nominations

References

1991 births
Living people
People from High Wycombe
Musicians from Buckinghamshire
21st-century Black British women singers
British people of Barbadian descent
British people of Jamaican descent
English women pop singers
English film actresses
English songwriters
Feminist musicians
Little Mix members